Pseudodama is an extinct species of deer found in Europe.

References

Cervines
Prehistoric deer
Prehistoric mammals of Europe
Prehistoric even-toed ungulate genera
Miocene even-toed ungulates